VFinity was a privately held software company based in New York City.  It was founded by former Chinese democracy leader Shen Tong in 2004, with a consulting and software customization company Wan Net Technology founded in 2000 as its predecessor.

VFinity sold web-based enterprise systems for digital asset management.  Its products were used by broadcasters, archives, educational and financial institutions in the United States and Asia to manage their multimedia assets. The VFinity platform was soft-launched during National Association of Broadcasters (NAB) 2006, which won recognition that launched its president Shen Tong into a Keynote Speech at NAB Super Session the following year. Independent research reports had also followed VFinity's attempted entry into various markets by Frost & Sullivan Hot Company Watch List  in 2007, ABI key players in World Digital Asset Management Markets  in 2008, and Forrester Rich Media Management Software  2010.

According to these research and other trade publications in higher education, information technology, archive and library science, broadcast technology, digital asset management among others, VFinity main value propositions and differentiation from other traditional DAM vendors are its Web2.0 approach to architecture, metadata, and user experiences. VFinity and Shen Tong promoted notions of "Context is King",  search centric extreme ease of use with zero user training, folksonomy (or free tagging) combined with taxonomy (expert tagging), zero client (or Web client).  VFinity platform seems to differ from traditional enterprise software especially in professional media industry in its Webby approach.

VFinity clients included cultural institutions, production and advertisement companies, film archives, national archives, and broadcasters: TriBeCa Film Festival, Beijing Olympics, Cathay Financials, National Taiwan University, Brandeis University, a PBS station producing prime time programming, Bloomberg L.P.

References 

Film and video technology
Companies established in 2005
Companies established in 2000
Information technology management

nl:Digital Asset Management